The Third Man is an album by Italian jazz trumpeter and composer Enrico Rava and pianist Stefano Bollani recorded in Switzerland in 2006 and released on the ECM label.

Reception
The Allmusic review by Thom Jurek awarded the album 4 stars stating "The Third Man is a brilliant collaboration and a beautifully accessible as well as adventurous offering".  The Penguin Guide to Jazz Recordings says that the album is “a relatively unusual record for the trumpeter in its spareness, but it stands with his very finest work.”

Track listing
All compositions by Enrico Rava except as indicated

 "Estate" (Bruno Brighetti, Bruno Martino) - 8:39 
 "The Third Man" (Stefano Bollani, Enrico Rava) - 5:10 
 "Sun Bay" - 4:35 
 "Retrato Em Branco y Preto" (Antonio Carlos Jobim) - 7:46 
 "Birth of a Butterfly" - 7:28 
 "Cumpari" - 4:51 
 "Sweet Light" - 6:11 
 "Santa Teresa" (Bollani) - 4:48 
 "Felipe" (Moacir Santos) - 5:10 
 "In Search of Titina" - 4:27 
 "Retrato Em Branco y Preto, Var." (Jobim) - 7:42 
 "Birth of a Butterfly, Var." - 5:15

Personnel
Enrico Rava - trumpet
Stefano Bollani - piano

References

ECM Records live albums
Enrico Rava albums
2007 albums
Albums produced by Manfred Eicher